Pelargoderus cincticornis is a species of beetle in the family Cerambycidae. It was described by Ritsema in 1895. It is known from Borneo.

References

cincticornis
Beetles described in 1895